Khalid Sharahili (Arabic: خالد شراحيلي; born 3 February 1987) is a Saudi Arabian footballer who  plays for Al-Shaeib as a goalkeeper. He also represented the Saudi Arabia national football team.

Club career

Al-Hilal
In 2007, Khalid joined Al-Hilal after being promoted from the youth system. On 13 January 2013, SAFF banned Khalid from any football activity for two years after finding that he took steroids. On 13 January 2015, Khalid ended his suspension. On 26 April 2015, Khalid broke the record of the most minutes without conceding a goal with 788 minutes. On 5 June 2015, Khalid saved a penalty in the shootout against Al-Nassr in the Kings Cup which made them win the trophy. On 8 May 2016, manager Giorgos Donis dropped Khalid due to his poor form. On 10 August 2017, Al-Hilal released Khaild due to his poor attitude.

Honours

Club
Al-Hilal
 Professional League (3): 2007-08, 2009-10, 2010-11
 King Cup (1): 2015
 Crown Prince Cup (5): 2007-08, 2009-10, 2010-11, 2011-12, 2015-16
 Super Cup (1): 2015

References

External links
Profile on Al-Hilal official website

1987 births
Living people
Saudi Arabian footballers
Sdoos Club players
Al Hilal SFC players
Al-Raed FC players
Al-Faisaly FC players
Ohod Club players
Damac FC players
Al Shaeib Club players
Saudi Arabia international footballers
Sportspeople from Riyadh
Association football goalkeepers
Saudi Professional League players
Saudi First Division League players
Saudi Second Division players